Raúl Antonio García Herrera (September 13, 1962 in San Miguel, El Salvador – January 11, 2018) was a Salvadoran professional footballer.

Club career
García played the majority of his career with Primera División de Fútbol de El Salvador giants Águila, in San Miguel.

International career
Nicknamed Superman, García made his debut for El Salvador in the 1980s and earned over 30 caps, scoring no goals. He represented his country in 17 FIFA World Cup qualification matches and played at the 1993 and 1995 UNCAF Nations Cup as well as at the 1996 CONCACAF Gold Cup.

His final international game was a November 1997 FIFA World Cup qualification match against the United States.

Retirement
He was named El Salvador's goalkeeper coach ahead of the UNCAF U-16 tournament in 2009 and the UNCAF U-20 championships at the end of 2010.

Death
Raul Garcia died due to cancer on January 11, 2018, he was 55 years old.

References

External links

1962 births
2018 deaths
People from San Miguel, El Salvador
Association football goalkeepers
Salvadoran footballers
El Salvador international footballers
1996 CONCACAF Gold Cup players
C.D. Águila footballers